Lowell is a given name. Notable people with the name include:

 Sir Cuthbert Lowell Ackroyd, 1st Baronet (1892–1973), of the Ackroyd Baronetcy of Dewsbury and Lord Mayor of London (1955–56)
 Godfrey Lowell Cabot (1861–1962), businessman and philanthropist
 Julian Lowell Coolidge (1873–1954), mathematician
 Abbott Lowell Cummings (born 1923), noted Yale architectural historian
 Lowell Bergman (born 1945), investigative reporter and television news magazine producer
 Lowell Cowell (born 1945), former NASCAR Cup Series driver
 Lowell E. English (1915–2005), USMC Maj. General
 Lowell Fulson (1921–1999), blues guitarist
 Lowell Ganz (born 1948), television producer and screenwriter
 Lowell George (1945–1979), songwriter, guitarist and late member of the band Little Feat
 Lowell E. Jones, American mathematician
 Lowell Lewis (born 1952), Chief Minister of Montserrat
 Richard Lowell Madden (born 1955), television personality and interior decorator aka Christopher Lowell
 Lowell Mason (1792–1872), gospel composer
 Lowell B. Mason (1893–1983), chair of the Federal Trade Commission
 Lowell Palmer (born 1947), MLB pitcher
 Lowell W. Perry (1931–2001), NFL player, coach, and sports commentator
 William Lowell Putnam (1861–1923), banker, lawyer, and philanthropist
 Lowell Sherman (1885–1934), actor, film director
 Lowell Smith (1892–1945), pioneer airman
 Lowell Thomas (1892–1981), newsman, radio and newsreel host best known as the man who made Lawrence of Arabia
 Lowell Thomas Jr. (born 1923), film and television producer, Alaskan Senator, and Alaskan Lt. Governor.
 Lowell Weicker (born 1931), former US Representative, Senator and Connecticut Governor
 Ava Lowle Willing (1868–1958), Philadelphia socialite and ex-wife of John Jacob Astor IV
 Lowell Wright (born 2003), Canadian soccer player
 Lowell M. (2000-) Filipino born, American Alien, artist and pianist. 
Fictional characters:
 Lowell Mather, character on TV sitcom Wings played by actor Thomas Haden Church